Francesca Fangio (born 17 August 1995) is an Italian swimmer. She competed at the 2020 Summer Olympics, in 200 m breaststroke. She competed in the women's 200 metre breaststroke event at the 2020 European Aquatics Championships, in Budapest, Hungary.

References

External links
 

1995 births
Living people
Sportspeople from Livorno
Italian female breaststroke swimmers
Swimmers at the 2020 Summer Olympics
Olympic swimmers of Italy
20th-century Italian women
21st-century Italian women
European Aquatics Championships medalists in swimming